was a feudal domain under the Tokugawa shogunate of Edo period Japan, located in Mimasaka Province in what is now the northern portion of modern-day Okayama Prefecture. It was centered around Katsuyama Castle which was located in what is now the city of Maniwa, Okayama and was controlled by a cadet branch tozama daimyō Miura clan throughout all of its history.  It was initially known as  after the original name of Katsuyama Castle, and in the late Bakumatsu period it was renamed  after its location in Mashima County.

History
In 1764, the fudai daimyō Miura Akitsugu transferred from Nishio Domain in Mikawa Province to a holding of equivalent kokudaka in Mimasaka Province. He rebuilt Takada Castle and renamed it Katsuyama Castle, and laid out a new jōkamachi which became the Katsuyama neighborhood of Maniwa. His son, Miura Noritsugu, encouraged the development of iron mines and iron ore remained a domain monopoly to the end of the Edo Period. The 9th daimyō, Miura Hirotsugu, supported the shogunate in the Bakumatsu period, but his son, and final daimyō, Miura Takatsugu supported the imperial cause and the clan was later ennobled with the kazoku peerage title of shishaku (viscount). 

In 1871 domain became "Mashima Prefecture" due to the abolition of the han system. It was incorporated into Okayama Prefecture via Hojo Prefecture.

Holdings at the end of the Edo period
As with most domains in the han system, Katsuyama Domain consisted of several discontinuous territories calculated to provide the assigned kokudaka, based on periodic cadastral surveys and projected agricultural yields. 

Mimasaka Province 
107 villages in Mashima District
1 village in Ōba District

List of daimyō 

{| class=wikitable
! #||Name || Tenure || Courtesy title || Court Rank || kokudaka 
|-
|colspan=6|  Miura clan, 1764-1871 (fudai daimyō)
|-
||1||Miura Akitsugu (三浦 明次)||1764 - 1772|| Shima-no-kami (志摩守)|| Junior 5th Rank, Lower Grade (従五位下)||  23,000 koku
|-
||2||Miura Noritsugu (三浦 矩次)||1772 - 1780|| Shima-no-kami (志摩守)|| Junior 5th Rank, Lower Grade (従五位下)||  23,000 koku
|-
||3||Miura Chikatsugu (三浦前次)||1780 - 1816|| Shima-no-kami (志摩守)|| Junior 5th Rank, Lower Grade (従五位下)||  23,000 koku
|-
||4||Miura Terutsugu (三浦毗次)||1816 - 1830|| Bingo-no-kami (備後守)|| Junior 5th Rank, Lower Grade (従五位下)||  23,000 koku
|-
||5||Miura Nobutsugu (三浦誠次)||1830 - 1831|| Shima-no-kami (志摩守)|| Junior 5th Rank, Lower Grade (従五位下)||  23,000 koku
|-
||6||Miura Toshitsugu (三浦峻次)||1831 - 1839|| Iki-no-kami (壱岐守)|| Junior 5th Rank, Lower Grade (従五位下)||  23,000 koku
|-
||7||Miura Yoshitsugu (三浦義次)||1839 - 1848||Bingo-no-kami (備後守)|| Junior 5th Rank, Lower Grade (従五位下)||  23,000 koku
|-
||8||Miura Akitsugu (三浦朗次)||1848 - 1860|| Shima-no-kami (志摩守)|| Junior 5th Rank, Lower Grade (従五位下)||  23,000 koku
|-
||9||Miura Hirotsugu (三浦弘次)||1860 - 1868||Bingo-no-kami (備後守)|| Junior 5th Rank, Lower Grade (従五位下)||  23,000 koku
|-
||9||Miura Takatsugu (三浦顕次)||1868 -  ||Bingo-no-kami (備後守)Genba-no-kami (玄蕃守)|| Junior 5th Rank, Lower Grade (従五位下)||  23,000 koku
|-
|}

See also 
 List of Han
 Abolition of the han system

Further reading
 Bolitho, Harold. (1974). Treasures Among Men: The Fudai Daimyo in Tokugawa Japan. New Haven: Yale University Press.  ;  OCLC 185685588

References

Domains of Japan
1764 establishments in Japan
States and territories established in 1764
1871 disestablishments in Japan
States and territories disestablished in 1871
Mimasaka Province
History of Okayama Prefecture